Cherry Tomato is a 2008 South Korean film starring Shin Goo and Kim Hyang-gi. The family drama, a directorial debut by Jung Young-bae, a poor old man and his granddaughter. It was screened at the Busan Children's Film Festival in 2008.

Plot

Cast
 Shin Goo as Park Gu
 Kim Hyang-gi as Da-seong
 Kim Byung-chun as Kap-soo
 Choi Ji-yeon as Hong-mi 
 Choi Dong-gyoon as Dong-hoon 
 Kim Young-ho as Da-seong's father, Choon-sam (cameo)

References

External links 
 
 
 

2008 films
2000s Korean-language films
Films directed by Jung Young-bae
South Korean drama films
2000s South Korean films